Joe Simenic (August 4, 1923 – February 7, 2015) was a baseball researcher, writer and a co-founder of the Society for American Baseball Research. He was considered "one of the true giants of baseball research."

Endeavors
Simenic worked for The Cleveland News and the Plain Dealer where he was assistant to publisher Thomas Vail. While with the News, he performed research for sports editor Ed Bang. While at the Dealer, he was a researcher for sports editor Hal Lebovitz. He corrected mistakes in the Baseball Register and helped identify hundreds of unknown baseball players.

In 1986, he won the Bob Davids Award, SABR's top honor. In 1997, his book The Cleveland Indians Encyclopedia, co-authored with sportswriter Russ Schneider, was published. His work was used and cited in dozens of books.

Personal life
He served in the Army Air Corps during World War II.

He was born in Kostanjevac, Croatia and died at age 91 in Westerville, Ohio.

References

1923 births
2015 deaths
Sports historians
United States Army Air Forces personnel of World War II
Yugoslav emigrants to the United States